Brigitte Yagüe Enrique (born 15 March 1981 in Palma de Mallorca, Balearic Islands, Spain) is a taekwondo practitioner from Spain.

In 2004, Yagüe qualified for the Athens Olympics, winning over rival Belen Asensio in the –49 kg class at the Spanish Olympic Trials. There, she was eliminated in the first round of the women's 49kg competition by losing 5–9 to Yaowapa Boorapolchai of Thailand.

In May 2008, she was named to a member of the Spain national taekwondo team and competed in the European Olympic Qualification Tournament in Istanbul, and lost to Sumeyye Gulec of Germany 1–2 in the quarterfinals.

In 2012, she won the silver medal at the London Olympics in the women's 49kg competition. She lost the gold medal match by 1-8 to Wu Jingyu of China.

She is married to Juan Antonio Ramos, a two-time taekwondo world champion. Both won flyweight gold in 2007 at Beijing.

See also
 List of Olympic medalists in taekwondo

References

External links
 London 2012 profile 

1981 births
Spanish female taekwondo practitioners
Taekwondo practitioners at the 2004 Summer Olympics
Olympic taekwondo practitioners of Spain
Living people
Taekwondo practitioners at the 2012 Summer Olympics
Olympic silver medalists for Spain
Olympic medalists in taekwondo
Medalists at the 2012 Summer Olympics
World Taekwondo Championships medalists
European Taekwondo Championships medalists
Taekwondo practitioners at the 2015 European Games
European Games competitors for Spain
21st-century Spanish women